Marc Ryan (born 14 October 1982) is a New Zealand racing cyclist.

At the 2008 Summer Olympics in Beijing, Ryan won the bronze medal as part of the New Zealand team in team pursuit, together with Sam Bewley, Hayden Roulston, and Jesse Sergent.

At the 2009–2010 UCI Track Cycling World Cup Classics in Melbourne, Ryan and Thomas Scully won the Men's Madison in a time of 44 minutes, 33 seconds, at an average speed of 53.9 km per hour. Second place went to the German riders, Robert Bengsch and Marcel Kalz, and third place to Ukraine.

At the 2012 London Olympics Ryan again won a bronze medal in the team pursuit, together with Jesse Sergent, Sam Bewley, Westley Gough and Aaron Gate.

Major results

2008
4th Prologue Tour of Southland
2009
4th Tour of Southland
1st Stage 1 TTT
2nd Stage 7
2010
3rd National Time Trial Championships
2012
2nd Prologue Tour de Savoie Mont Blanc

References

External links
 

Cyclists at the 2004 Summer Olympics
Cyclists at the 2008 Summer Olympics
Cyclists at the 2012 Summer Olympics
Olympic cyclists of New Zealand
Olympic bronze medalists for New Zealand
New Zealand track cyclists
Commonwealth Games bronze medallists for New Zealand
Cyclists at the 2006 Commonwealth Games
1982 births
Living people
Olympic medalists in cycling
New Zealand male cyclists
Cyclists at the 2010 Commonwealth Games
Medalists at the 2012 Summer Olympics
Medalists at the 2008 Summer Olympics
Sportspeople from Timaru
Cyclists at the 2014 Commonwealth Games
Commonwealth Games medallists in cycling
Medallists at the 2006 Commonwealth Games
Medallists at the 2010 Commonwealth Games
Medallists at the 2014 Commonwealth Games